The Providence Grays hired veteran manager Harry Wright to guide the team in 1882 and the team seemed to improve. They held first place until September 17, but then suffered a losing streak that dropped the team into second place.

After the season ended, they played a three-game postseason series against the Boston Red Caps for the "Championship of New England." Providence won the series, two games to one, thanks to shutouts pitched by John Montgomery Ward and Hoss Radbourn.

Regular season

Season standings

Record vs. opponents

Roster

Player stats

Batting

Starters by position
Note: Pos = Position; G = Games played; AB = At bats; H = Hits; Avg. = Batting average; HR = Home runs; RBI = Runs batted in

Other batters
Note: G = Games played; AB = At bats; H = Hits; Avg. = Batting average; HR = Home runs; RBI = Runs batted in

Pitching

Starting pitchers
Note: G = Games pitched; IP = Innings pitched; W = Wins; L = Losses; ERA = Earned run average; SO = Strikeouts

References
1882 Providence Grays season at Baseball Reference

Providence Grays seasons
Providence Grays season
Providence